Tate District is the smallest of fourteen districts of the province Ica in Peru.

References

1964 establishments in Peru
States and territories established in 1964